Phantom Detective (lit. "Detective Hong Gil-Dong: Disappeared Village") is a 2016 South Korean film noir  action comedy film directed and written by Jo Sung-hee. Its central protagonist is a modern iteration of the classic Korean folk hero Hong Gildong. It was released in South Korea on May 4, 2016. It was released in U.S. and Canada on 20 May 2016.

Synopsis
Hong Gil-Dong (Lee Je-hoon) runs an illegal detective agency with President Hwang (Go Ara). They try to take down evil people following the will of President Hwang's late father. Hong Gil-Dong is able to track virtually anyone down in a day, except for Kim Byeong-Duk (Park Geun-hyung) who has eluded him for more than twenty years. Kim Byeong-Duk is the man who killed Hong Gil-Dong's mother. Hong Gil-Dong's memory begins at the age of 8 when his mother was killed.

Finally, Hong Gil-Dong learns of Kim Byeong-Duk's location and drives there late at night. Right before he arrives, Kim Byeong-Duk is kidnapped and only his granddaughters Dong-Yi (Roh Jeong-eui) and Mal-Soon (Kim Ha-na) are left. Following his urge for revenge, Hong Gil-Dong takes the granddaughters to find their grandfather. Soon, Hong Gil-Dong finds himself up against the ultra dark and powerful Gwangeunhwe organization.

Cast
Lee Je-hoon as Hong Gil-dong
Ko Woo-rim as Hong Gil-dong (young)
Kim Sung-kyun as Kang Sung-il
Go Ara as President Hwang
Park Geun-hyung as Kim Byung-deok
Lee Jun-hyeok as real estate agency owner
Roh Jeong-eui as Dong-i
Kim Ha-na as Mal-soon
Hwang Bo-ra as used-book store woman
Byun Yo-han as Gwangeunhwe member following Hong Gil-dong (cameo)
Yoo Seung-mok as Tae-kwang auto repair shop owner
Hong Yeong Geon as Kim Jin-ho
Yoon Yeong-gyoon as Choi Tae-jeong
Jung Sung-hwa as innkeeper
Lee Min-woong as Chinese restaurant employee
Park Ji-Hoon as police officer 1
Park Jung-won as police officer 4

References

External links

2010s action comedy-drama films
South Korean action comedy-drama films
Works based on Hong Gildong jeon
2010s Korean-language films
South Korean crime comedy-drama films
CJ Entertainment films
South Korean detective films
2016 comedy films
2010s South Korean films